Fred Hartley (1905–1980) was a Scottish pianist, conductor and composer of light music best known for his waltz Rouge et Noir. He sometimes composed music under the pseudonym Iris Taylor.

Hartley was born in Dundee in 1905, where he attended Harris Academy. He later attained a scholarship to the Royal Academy of Music. He made his first public broadcast as a solo pianist in 1925 and in 1931 went on to form his "Novelty Quintet", which regularly made broadcasts on the BBC. In 1946, he was made Head of BBC Light Music.

He composed mainly in the light music genre and his compositions were often featured on the BBC Light Programme. In addition to "Rouge et Noir", compositions for orchestra include the "Scherzetto for Children", "The Hampden Roar", "Alpine Festival", "The Ball at Aberfeldy", "Whispering Breeze", "Hampden Road March" and "A Dream of Hawaii". A fuller list is available at Philip Scowcroft's Light Music Garland site.

Fred Hartley published several of his piano works under the name Iris Taylor: "Dreamy Afternoon", "Cuckoo in Love", "Twentieth Century Nocturne" and "Starry Night".

References

1905 births
1980 deaths
Scottish composers
Light music composers
Alumni of the Royal Academy of Music
People from Dundee
Scottish pianists
People educated at Harris Academy
20th-century British pianists
20th-century classical musicians
20th-century British composers
20th-century Scottish musicians